This is a list of awards and nominations received by actor and filmmaker Mel Gibson. Gibson is best known as an action hero, for roles such as Martin Riggs in the Lethal Weapon buddy cop film series, and Max Rockatansky in the first three films in the Mad Max post-apocalyptic action series. He produced, directed, and starred in the epic historical drama film Braveheart, for which he won the Golden Globe Award and Academy Award for Best Director, along with the Academy Award for Best Picture. He later directed and produced the financially successful and controversial, biblical drama film The Passion of the Christ. He received further critical notice for his directorial work of the action-adventure film Apocalypto, which is set in Mesoamerica during the early 16th century. After a 10-year hiatus from directing, Gibson returned with the critically praised and financially successful Hacksaw Ridge, which won the Academy Awards for Best Sound Mixing and Best Film Editing and earned Gibson his second nomination for Best Director.

Major associations

Academy Awards
The Academy Awards, or "Oscars" are a set of awards given annually for excellence of cinematic achievements. The awards, organized by the Academy of Motion Picture Arts and Sciences (AMPAS), were first held in 1929 at the Hollywood Roosevelt Hotel. Gibson has received two awards from three nominations.

British Academy Film Awards
The British Academy Film Award is an annual award show presented by the British Academy of Film and Television Arts. The awards were founded in 1947 as The British Film Academy, by David Lean, Alexander Korda, Carol Reed, Charles Laughton, Roger Manvell and others. Gibson has received two nominations.

Directors Guild Awards
The Directors Guild of America (DGA) is an entertainment guild which represents the interests of film and television directors in the United States motion picture industry and abroad. Founded as the Screen Directors Guild in 1936, the group merged with the Radio and Television Directors Guild in 1960 to become the modern Directors Guild of America. Gibson has received one nomination.

Golden Globe Awards
The Golden Globe Award is an accolade bestowed by the 93 members of the Hollywood Foreign Press Association (HFPA) recognizing excellence in film and television, both domestic and foreign. Gibson has won once in four nominations.

Other awards and nominations

Australian Film Critics Association

Australian Film Institute / AACTA Awards

Blockbuster Entertainment Awards

Critic's Choice Awards
The Critics' Choice Movie Awards have been presented annually since 1995 by the Broadcast Film Critics Association for outstanding achievements in the film industry. Gibson has received one award from two nominations.

Fangoria Chainsaw Awards

Film Critics Circle of Australia

Golden Raspberry Awards

Karlovy Vary International Film Festival

Hollywood Film Awards

Irish Film & Television Academy

Jupiter Awards

MTV Movie & TV Awards

National Board of Review

Kids' Choice Awards

North Texas Film Critics Association

People's Choice Awards

Phoenix Film Critics Society

Satellite Awards

Saturn Awards
The Saturn Awards are presented annually by the Academy of Science Fiction, Fantasy and Horror Films to honor science fiction, fantasy, and horror films, television and home video. Gibson has received three nominations.

References

External links
 
 Mel Gibson at AllMovie

Gibson, Mel
Gibson, Mel
Awards